GelGreen is an intercalating nucleic acid stain used in molecular genetics for agarose gel DNA electrophoresis. GelGreen consists of two acridine orange subunits that are bridged by a linear oxygenated spacer.

Its fluorophore, and therefore its optical properties, are essentially identical to those of other N-alkylacridinium orange dyes. When exposed to ultraviolet light, it will fluoresce with a greenish color that strongly intensifies after binding to DNA. The substance is marketed as a less toxic and more sensitive alternative to ethidium bromide. GelGreen is sold as a solution in either DMSO or water.

See also 

 Ethidium bromide
 GelRed
 SYBR Green I
 Agarose gel electrophoresis and gel electrophoresis of nucleic acids
 Acridine orange

References 

Aromatic amines
Iodides
DNA-binding substances
Carboxamides
Quaternary ammonium compounds
Acridine dyes
Staining dyes